is a Japanese manga series written and illustrated by Mineo Maya. The comedy manga was serialized in Hana to Yume from 1978 to 1990, before switching to Bessatsu Hana to Yume from 1991 where it continues to be published.

An anime adaptation, produced by Toei Animation, originally aired from April 8, 1982 to May 13, 1983 on Fuji TV, and was the first to present shōnen-ai themes on television.

Two spin-off mangas, Patalliro Saiyuki! and Patalliro Genji Monogatari!, were originally serialized from 2003 to 2005 and 2004 to 2008 respectively, with Patalliro Saiyuki! getting an anime adaptation produced by Magic Bus and airing on Kids Station from June 5 to November 9, 2005.

As of 2019, the manga had over 25 million copies in circulation, making it one of the best-selling manga series.

Plot 
The story focuses on comedy, primarily the wacky adventures of Patalliro himself and the entire kingdom of Malynera.

Characters 

The 10-year-old diabetic brainchild king of Malynera. When he becomes frustrated or embarrassed, he grooms himself like a cat.

Maraich Juschenfe
18-year-old former assassin from the Diamond Syndicate. His former lover Count Larken told him not to return until he could kill Bancoran, but ended up reforming and becoming Bancoran's lover. He has a ferocious temper and seethes with jealousy whenever a bishōnen is in Bancoran's vicinity. He beats up Bancoran on a regular basis, regardless of whether or not he cheats, and somehow got pregnant twice, despite being completely male. 
His pregnancy is cut out of the anime. In the manga he first gets pregnant in volume 10, and a second time in volume 46. He is an expert knife user, and his looks and body allow him to easily pass for a woman with only Patalliro and Bancoran being able to see through his disguise.

Jack Barbarosa Bancoran
Major Bancoran of the British MI6. Nicknamed "Bishōnen Killer" for his ability to seduce young men with just his eyes. Patalliro questioned Bancoran to discern if he was interested in his mother, but Bancoran stated that he was only attracted to men. Meeting Patalliro has changed his existence; after playing bodyguard to the most annoying person he's ever met, he's now living with Maraich, who tried to kill him, and their son Figaro. Bancoran is known for his blue eyeshadow (purple in Patalliro Saiyuki), his long black hair, and the fact that he never takes off his gloves, even in bed. His name comes from Henri Bencolin.

Tamanegi
Patalliro biseinen bodyguards, forced to hide their beauty under padded uniforms, frosted glasses, masks that cover their mouths, noses, and onion-style wigs.

Anime

Cast 
Boku Patalliro!
Patalliro: Fuyumi Shiraishi
Bancoran: Kazuyuki Sogabe
Maraich: Toshiko Fujita
Police Chief: Ichirō Nagai
Head Guard: Takeshi Aono
Tamanegi: Akio Nojima, Toshio Furukawa, Tōru Furuya, Yūji Mitsuya, Yoku Shioya, Kaneto Shiozawa, Kazuhiko Inoue, Akira Kamiya
The Tamanegi were portrayed by the members of Slapstick, a voice actor band Sogabe was a member of.
Etrange: Masako Ikeda
Sanders: Junpei Takiguchi
Patalliro 7th: Kazuko Sugiyama
Patalliro 10th: Minori Matsushima
Plasma X: Hideyuki Hori
Afro 18: Eiko Masuyama
Pulara: Michiko Nomura
α Random: Junko Hori

Patalliro! Saiyuki
Patalliro/Son Goku: Yuki Kaida
Maraich/Genjo Sanzo: Reiko Takagi
Bancoran: Takehito Koyasu
Mi-chan: Ken'yū Horiuchi
Cho Hakkai: Yoshirō Matsumoto
Sa Gojo: Rikiya Koyama
Gautama Buddha: Kazuya Tatekabe

Music
 by Fusako Fujimoto (Patalliro! / Boku Patalliro!)
 by v-u-den (Patalliro Saiyuki)
 by Eri Takeda. (Patalliro 1st ending)
 by Fuyumi Shiraishi & Slapstick. (Boku Patalliro 1st ending)(from "Who killed Cock Robin?")
 by Berryz Kobo. (Patalliro Saiyuki)

Episode Synopsis

Episode 1: Pretty Boy Killer (Bishounen-Killer) 
Prince Patalliro the 8th arrives at the London Heathrow Airport as a goodwill ambassador from the country of the Malynera. There, he meets Bancoran, the special agent from MI6, who was appointed as the Prince's bodyguard during his time in England. Patalliro declines the services of Bancoran but Bancoran insists as there is internal conflict within the country of Malynera between the Prime Minister and Royal Family. Bancoran is worried that the Prime Minister might take action against Pataliro during his time in England, and also to keep an eye on Patalliro after his silly stunt of trying to fly the plane himself. 

Jada, a long serving bishounen servant of Patalliro, enters the room and serves Patalliro his snack. Jada falls in love with Bancoran at first sight. Patalliro chides Jada for spacing out and the Tamanegi (Onion Shaped Head) subordinae tells Patalliro that this is a common reaction from bishounens as Bancoran is nicknamed the Bishounen-Killer (Pretty Boy Killer). 

During nightfall, Patalliro discusses his plan with Jada. Turns out that Patalliro has plans to swipe a painting from the London Art Museum and hence Bancoran's presence is a hindrance. The rumour that Pataliro heard from Jada is that Patalliro's father was a romantic and he hid love letters he was exchanging with a woman in the back of a painting. Patalliro hopes to retrieve the painting so that the Prime Minister does not get his hands on it and make it into a huge scandal. 

Bancoran intrudes on their discussion sensing they are plotting something. Pataliiro makes the excuse that he and Jada are thinking to sneak out at night to a playboy club. This infuriates Bancoran and keeps Patalliro under constant supervision to the extent of sleeping in the same bed. Patalliro asks if Bancoran is thinking to rape him to which Bancoran replies that he would rather jump into the Thames River and die. 

Patalliro tries to seduce Bancoran through the night, letting him get little sleep but finally ends up being hung from the ceiling.

Early next morning, Patalliro sneaks out to meet with Jada to head to the London Art Musuem thinking that he has left Bancoran sleeping in the room after a taxing night. However, Bancoran is tailing them.

At the right time, Jada creates a small fires outside the premises of the museum causing the patrons to evacuate. Patalliro stays behind and places a blank cloth over the original painting and cries wolf that the painting has been stolen and to pursue the thief. He then volunteers to take the empty frame to the police to examine the fingerprints of the thief and thereby taking the painting out of the museum in broad daylight. All this was witnessed by Bancoran.

As Patalliro was making his escape with the painting, a guard comes out of the bushes and shoots at him. Bancoran sees this from a distance and warns Patalliro to duck for safety. Cross fire starts and Bancoran fends off the shooters. Patalliro escapes.

While heading back to the hotel in the lift, Patalliro tells Bancoran that something is wrong as his plan was confidential and the museum guards started shooting without warning. When the lift door opens, Jada was shocked to see Patalliro while the Tamanegi were acting as usual.

Back in the hotel room, Patalliro starts to search for clues to the hidden letters. Bancoran observes that Jada is behaving anxiously. Finally Patalliro questions Jada why there are no letters hidden at the back of the painting as claimed and asks who was the one that told Jada about the letters and Jada breaks down to confess that his father was in financial difficulties and the whole thing was a fabrication and trap orchestrated by the Malynera Prime Minister. Jada insists that he has no idea that the Prime Minister was intending to kill Patalliro and thought it was a scheme to simply embarrass him.

Bancoran has doubts on Jada’s story and mentioned that he did not kill anyone of the guards shooting at Patalliro as he had no idea who were the real guards or the assassins. He goes on further to say that his bullets swept over the guards right hands by a centimetre and so would have left burnt marks.

Patalliro checks and finds a fresh burnt mark on Jada’s right hand. Jada , seeing that his game is up, reveals that he is an assassin who will work for the right price paid and proceeds to shoot at Patalliro. Bancoran foils Jada’s attempt by wounding him on his left arm and is swiftly taken away by the Tamanegi guards. Bancoran comforts Patalliro for Jada’s betrayal thinking that Patalliro is stifling his cries. But Patalliro is actually stifling his laughs as he has plans to milk this affair.

The next day, Bancoran confronts Patalliro at the Heathrow Airport as Patalliro has plans to extradite Jada back to Malynera to make him witness against the Prime Minister’s plot. Patalliro tells Bancoran that he will pay Jada half of ten thousand pounds for his confession and his money was obtained by threatening the London Art Museum Director as the museum guards had shot at a Malynera royalty during his visit. Patalliro threatened to get him fired or make it into an international problem. Patalliro will pocket the other five thousand pounds as an allowance. With this, they send off the shameless Malynera prince back to the blue skies.

Episode 2: The Flower Falls on a Misty Night 
Back in the country of Malynera, the Majesty is ill and Patalliro is fulfilling his duties as Crown Prince by stepping in. While frolicking in his ways, the guard brings bad news that His Majesty’s is in crtical condition. Later on, the news report that the Great King Higgins the Third pass away due to heart failure.

In his state of grieve, Patalliro visits London via a chartered plane and requests for Bancoran to be his bodyguard again. Bancoran declines but his boss pressures him into accepting the mission as Patalliro will be the next King of Malynera as the current king has just passed away.

Bancoran questions Patalliro’s motives this time and he reveals that he is looking for his cousin. Patalliro’s aunt had eloped with a travelling musician, became a commoner and settled down in London. She had a child but had died recently. Patalliro is certain that his cousin would want to come back to Malynera and thus the reason for his visit.

Patalliro and Bancoran meets the cousin, Thatcher, who is a bishounen and Thatcher immediately falls under the charm of Bancoran. Patalliro tells Thatcher to stay in the neighboring room before he heads back. Thatcher proceeds to aid the Tamanegi in serving tea. Bancoran comments that Thatcher is too good to be his cousin and Patalliro explains that his aunt refused any assistance after her elopement and thus Thatcher must not have a good childhood and hopes to make it up to him.

In the evening, Bancoran was briefly asking Thatcher on Patalliro’s whereabouts when a gunshot was heard. Thatcher immediately exclaims to Bancoran that he is running in the wrong direction as the gunshot came from the Tamenegi’s HQ. Patalliro appears and tells Bancoran that he was in the toilet for 2 hours reading a book.   When Bancoran reaches where Thatcher is, he find a Tamanegi guard unconscious with a gunshot wound and a fallen cup of tea on the floor. Bancoran inspects the room hastily and concludes that the assailant had escaped through the window. Bancoran instructs Thatcher to call and ambulance for the wounded guard immediately.  

Patalliro raises questions on the whole affair as the Tamanegi are trained Royal Guards and hence it would be unthinkable for them to experience a frontal assault without any resistance. Thatcher claims that the assailant might have confused the Tamanegi guard with Patalliro and hence was assaulted in his stead. Patalliro thinks the explanation is too simplistic.

The next day Bancoran reports to his boss to give him a status update leaving the guarding of Patalliro to his subordinate for the day. Bancoran’s boss hands over a report commissioned by Patalliro to look into body of the wounded Tamanegi. The report reveals that there was a lot of aesthetic in the bloodwork. Bancoran immediately calls Patalliro to relay the news.

Shortly after, Thatcher arrives with the usual tea and inquires on the whereabouts of Bancoran to which Patalliro replies that he is currently at MI6. Patalliro proceeds to drink the tea served by Thatcher and Thatcher leaves the room. The next scene shows Patalliro slumped over the table with his tea cup spewed.  A recording at the back of the room plays a gunshot and Bancoran’s subordinate is startled. Immediately, Thatcher screams, “Patalliro” and heads towards Patalliro’s room in breakneck speed reaching the scene faster than the MI6 agent.

Thatcher, first to reach Patalliro room, brings out a gun equipped with a silencer and just as he was about to shoot, his face changes to one of astonishment as he sees Patalliro wide awake at his desk.

Patalliro questions Thatcher about his motives and Thatcher proceeds to lock the door preventing the MI6 agent from interfering. Patalliro goes on to describe Thatcher’s modus operandi of drugging the Tamanegi to sleep in the tea served and being the first to rush to the room to shoot at the guard with a silencer and once again questions his motives. Thacher replies that it is obvious that this all is an act of revenge against the Royal Family of Malynera as they have heartlessly kicked his mother out of the Royal Family and would not even give any financial assistance causing her to suffer in later life. Patalliro answers that Thatcher mom had left the Royal Palace willingly and refused all aid and it was Thatcher who is mistaken. Thatcher refuses Patalliro’s version of the story and says that someone had told him the real truth and that Thatcher will be the next king of Malynera should Patalliro perish to which Patalliro replies that there are plenty of successors after the Crown Prince and Thatcher’s turn would be remotely next in line. Thatcher turns furious and just as the room is about to be breeched by the MI6, Thatcher gripes at the trigger… a gunshot is heard.

Patalliro clutches his heart and stumbles back, calling for Bancoran. Bancoran appears at the door and Patalliro tells him that he is a little too late. Bancoran tells Patalliro that the sound of the gunshot came from Bancoran (since Thatcher’s had a silencer). And so Patalliro is safe.

Thatcher’s right hand is wounded. Both Bancoran and Patalliro chides him for believing in unfounded lies and question Thatcher on the person behind the scenes. Thatcher refuses to cooperate and escapes by crashing himself out of the window. Patalliro gives chase and as Thatcher runs along street, a black car in waiting speeds up to mercilessly knock him over. Thatcher’s last words revealed that he is glad to die in Bancoran’s arm and that the mastermind is the guy driving the black car. Thatcher dies and Patalliro vows to catch culprit.

Episode 3: The Rose that Blooms on His Grave 
One month after the death of the King, it is time to prepare for the coronation ceremony of the New King of Malynera. Patalliro receives a call from Bancoran to inform him that Thatcher’s killer is an officer of the International Diamond Syndicate (IDS). Patalliro knows them well as Malynera has a world-famous diamond mine.  The IDS has a monopoly over all the diamond transactions worldwide and Patalliro has incurred their wrath by withdrawing for the organisation to do independent. Patalliro further informs Bancoran that the coronation ceremony will take place one later and has invited Bancoran to the event.

Back in London, the IDS convenes a top-secret meeting behind veiled screens. The Boss of IDS is seen stroking a cat on his lap while commenting that “No.4” was tasked with the “Malynera job” but No. 4 reports that the mission with Thatcher has failed.  No.9’s son aka No.9 Junior (who is representing his father whom has taken ill) chides No.4 for failing in his mission and proceeds to assault No.4 with a flying dagger. No.4 is removed from the meeting. No. 9 Jr requests for the Boss to let him take up the mantle of removing Patalliro as the next King to which the Boss agrees. The screen lifts up to reveal that No.9 Jr is a bishounen.

Bancoran arrives in Malynera and Patalliro introduces Bancoran as his bodyguard from England to “Junior” (No. 9 Jr ) who is currently in disguise as the journalist from BBC who is covering Patalliro’s life story and the coronation event.  Junior falls for the charms of Bancoran, the Bishounen Killer, on first sight.

Patalliro shows Bancoran and Junior the venue for the coronation ceremony which is a temple used for tourist attraction. Going in deeper into the temple grounds, Patalliro reveals that there is a cemetery underground. The way leading to the cemetery is a complex labyrinth as the ancestors of the Malynera Royal Family are buried in there with their jewels and is to thwart grave robbers. Patalliro heads bac to attend a cabinet meeting and leaves Bancoran and Junior in the basement.

Junior is fascinated and starts taking photos excitedly. In his excitement, he misses a step and Bancoran suavely moves in to embrace Junior princess style to prevent Junior from falling. At this point, things turn sensual and Bancoran makes a move on Junior as Bancoran warms Junior’s body against the cold temple grounds….

Back in his room, Junior develops the photos he has taken and observes that the temple structure is similar to the Egyptian Pyramids when the tomb is improperly infiltrated, the ceiling of the tomb will collapse. Junior thus plans to crumble the ceiling of the tomb which is the floor of the temple during the coronation ceremony. However, he is hesitant to harm Bancoran.

Meanwhile, Patalliro is busy with his coronation practise but finds both Bancoran and Junior spending lots of time together. Bancoran heads to Junior room to find Junior has left his blazer jacket lying on the bed. Bancoran hangs up Junior’s blazer only to find an IDS emblem inside the blazer. This shocks Bancoran and he being ransacking the room for any suspicious items, only to find a fuse for an explosive device.

In the morning of Coronation Day, Bancoran searches the premises and asks Patalliro how many people are attending the coronation event to which Patalliro replies that it is a day of festivities and hence the whole nation of Malynera will make their way to the temple. Bancoran senses something amiss and just as he was about to proceed to the temple, Junior appears and asks Bancoran to go to another interesting place he found and that they will be back by ceremony time. Bancoran leaves with Junior after leaving a request with Patalliro.

Junior brings Bancoran to a field of wild roses to admire the beauty of nature but shortly after which Bancoran expresses his desire to head to the temple. Junior attempts to delay Bancoran by flaunting his charms and also reminding Bancoran that he only needs to be back by Coronation time. Bancoran succumbs to Junior’s seduction and both indulge in some couple-time.

The next scene shows Junior and Bancoran awaking from their romantic siesta and soon it time for the Coronation Ceremony. When Bancoran tries to head to the Coronation Ceremony, once again Junior expresses his hesitation and Bancoran reminds Junior that he needs to cover the event as a journalist to which Junior says that he doesn’t care.

Immediately after this exchange, an explosion is heard from the direction of the temple and Bancoran voices his thoughts aloud and asks if someone might have sabotage the ceremony. Junior does not seem concerned and Bancoran articulates further that the temple is a big place and the explosion might not have its intended effect to which Junior retorts what if the explosion was on the ceiling of the tunnels causing the temple floor to collapse. At this point Bancoran realises that Junior has just confessed his M.O. and rushes to the temple tunnels, zooming off in his red Porsche, leaving Junior behind. Just as Junior contemplates that Bancoran is too late, a crow flies pass the high noon sun and Junior realises that the coronation ceremony has yet to start.

Bancoran reaches the temple grounds and Patalliro asks if the blast engineered by the soldiers was acceptable and Bancoran asks Patalliro to evacuate everyone but Patalliro refuses without hearing the reason as they are numerous VIPs such as ambassadors and media. Bancoran exclaims that there is a bomb and if Patalliro has forgotten the event with Thatcher (see Episode 2). Patalliro understands and proceeds to rub his face against the glove hand of Bancoran.

Junior arrives at the temple to see it devoid of any activity. With a wild rose in hand, Junior walks towards the empty throne of Malynera. There he spots Bancoran with his signature cigar waiting behind a temple pillar. Melancholic music plays in the background and Junior walks towards Bancoran, accusing him of being a liar to which Bancoran replies that Junior too has lied. Junior asks Bancoran for his true identity to which Bancoran reveals that he is an ranked an MI6 agent, ranked Major. Junior expresses that it isn’t surprising as Bancoran cannot simply be a mere bodyguard. Bancoran askes for Junior’s real name as he only knew him as Junior to which Junior replies that his real name is Bjorn. Junior kisses the rose in his hand and throws it into the air thereafter. Bancoran drops his cigar and soon an exchange of dagger versus bullet ensues. Junior is shot and the dagger misses Bancoran as it went slightly above the left shoulder of its intended target. Junior falls to the ground and Bancoran whispers “Bjorn”.

Right after, the planted bomb explodes and the temple starts to shake violently. Bancoran is fore to evacuate leaving Junior’s body behind. Soon, the temple ground gives way and all the pillars of the temple crumble along. Junior’s body is buried along…

Bancoran escapes unscathed and watches the temple monument collapse spectacularly from afar. Patalliro walks up to Bancoran and cracks a cryptic joke.

In the last segments, Patalliro is shown wearing the crown of Malynera and that the coronation ceremony has taken place in the palace reception hall at the third level with 2 to 3 people falling right out of the windows as the venue was too cramped to house that many guests. Bancoran requests Patalliro to arrange for a flight out of Malynera asap appearing to be still distraught over Junior’s demise. Wanting to be left alone, Patalliro leaves Bancoran to his own and Bancoran vows to crush the IDS for Bjorn’s sake.

The next day, Patalliro sees Bancoran off at the airport only to be sent off in a fighter jet plane at Mach 3 or 4 speed. Patalliro exclaims that this was to fulfil Bancoran’s request for a flight out of Malynera asap and so he sent Bancoran back in Malynera’s fastest plane.

Episode 4: Watch Out, Patalliro! 
In the Royal Palace of Malynera, while Patalliro has been officially crowned as Emperor he requests for the Royal Physician as well as the Prime Minister to address him as Highness. While the Royal Physician is chiding Patalliro in his diet choices due to his poor health, the Prime Minister intrudes with urgent news that someone claiming to be Patalliro’s elder brother has arrived in the palace.

Upon entering the room, Patalliro sees a tall figure with silver hair and questions the age of the man to which he responds that he is 46. Patalliro wonders if the previous emperor can father a child at 9 years old, the Prime Minister chips in to explain that the man is actually the lawyer representative of the proclaimed elder brother.

The lawyer presents a jewellery, presumably the crest of the Malynera Kingdom. According to the lawyer, the crest was deposited in a Swiss Bank Vault by the King Higgins the Third, (Patalliro’s Father) together with a handwritten letter. The letter states that the previous king had fathered another child 15 years ago with a woman while overseas and the crest is to be inherited by that boy. The boy was tracked down in an orphanage and the lawyer requests for the boy to be instated as a prince of Malynera.  The lawyer introduces Marion, the supposed, First Prince of Malynera to Patalliro and Patalliro is immediately taken by the beauty of the bishounen.

Marion is touched to tears to be reunited with Patalliro and they both share a heartfelt embrace with Patalliro starting to touch Marion in weird places. The lawyer becomes upset at Patalliro’s action and exclaims that Marion is a true prince of the Malynera Kingdom but Patalliro expresses his doubts as he has receives several similar claims from people wanting a stake in Malynera’s riches. The parties decide to give each other time to look into the issue further with the lawyer expecting to be rewarded for his efforts.

Patalliro rings up Bancoran in the MI6 while he was frolicking with a boy. Patalliro tells Bancoran of the problem at hand and requests for Bancoran to investigate the matter citing that it is not in the previous King’s character to abandon his own son and that Marion does not appear to have lived in an orphanage. Bancoran agrees to the request.

That night, Marion is woken up in bed by strange rushed footsteps approaching his room. Patalliro soon enters the room with a wine glass and offers the drink to Marion. Marion declines that he does not drink and Patalliro explains that he always has a glass before bed to sleep better due to his nightmares. Marion thanks Patalliro for his kindness and Patalliro expresses that there no need to by shy as they are probably brothers anyway. Marion goes on to say that he is not interested in Malynera’s riches but am simply happy to be reunited with his younger brother, a blood relative, after being alone in the world for the longest time. Marion proceeds to gives Patalliro a goodnight kiss on his lips, making Patalliro weak in the knees. Marion subsequently picks up the glass of wine and drinks it, ending with an evil twinkle in his eye.

Internal Malynera investigation reveals that the crest was indeed taken out of the Royal Vault 15 years ago and the letter was also handwritten by the former King. Should Marion’s position as first prince be recognised, this means that Marion will be first in line to inherit the throne followed by the former King’s younger brother (Patalliro’s paternal uncle). This infuriates their uncle and he refuses to accept Marion and quarrelling ensures.

Patalliro and Marion leaves the quarrelling parties and Patalliro asks Marion to give him an afternoon nap kiss to which Marion gladly complies. The Royal Physician meets Patalliro and reminds him to take his medication. Marion passes the Royal Physician and secretly enquires if things are going as planned to which the Royal Physician replies that everything is underway.

Late in the night, Patalliro is woken up by a long distance call from Bancoran and vents his frustrations on Bancoran. Bancoran notices that Patalliro is in an unusually bad mood and asks what is wrong to which Patalliro mentions that he is feeling in the best of shape recently. Bancoran proceeds to give a status report on his own findings and mentions that there is nothing amiss on the boy and the lawyer comes from a reputable law firm in France as well. The only thing out of the ordinary was that was robbery at the aforementioned Swiss bank that the jewellery was stored in last year and $5million dollars in cash was stolen. The robber is man called the Silver Fox and is rumoured to have silver hair. No one truly knows his face nor his whereabouts. This alarms Patalliro as he recalled that the lawyer had silver hair.

The next morning, while pondering if the lawyer was indeed Silver Fox, he visits Marion and asks Marion how long has he known the Silver Fox to which Marion replies about 2 months ago. Patalliro asks further if the lawyer has made him sign any legal document and Marion says no. Patalliro leaves the room and continues to think aloud, wondering if the Silver Fox would take advantage or blackmail Marion should Marion take over the thrown in Patalliro’s absence. At this stage, Patalliro realises that he has forgotten to ask for a morning kiss from Marion and  returns back to where Marion is.

There he finds Marion gone from is seat but noise coming from the shower room. Patalliro is tempted to enter the shower room and while he is battling his inner demons, Marion is communicating with a communication device. The conversation talks of Patalliro being suspicious and that they should get rid of him soon. Marion replies that he understands and will be careful in executing his mission.

When Patalliro finally opens the door to the shower room, he peeks at Marion who has just came out of the shower drying himself and realises that Marion has a brunette wig and his natural hair is silver. This shocks Patalliro and Patalliro realises that Marion is part of the Silver Fox.

Marion quickly injects poisons into Patalliro through a syringe. Marion explains that for a normal person, the amount of toxin will not be deadly but for Patalliro who has been on long term medication, there will be fatal consequences due to adverse drug reactions. There won’t be any trace of the poisoning and that the Royal Physician is part of the plan too.  Patalliro question Marion of the lawyer were his father and if they are Silver Fox to which Marion replies that the entire law firm is Silver Fox.  Marion goes on the explain that while robbing the bank, they found the crest and proceeded to forge a letter with the handwriting of Higgins the Third as well as  orphanage records of the character Marion. It took them about a year to carry out the plan.

In his attempt to escape, Patalliro is blocked by Marion and soon falls to the ground clutching his chest. Surprised that Patalliro can still move about, Marion decides to inject another syringe into Patalliro to hasten the effects of the poison.

However, in the midst of the second attempt, the syringe is broken by a gunshot through the window and Bancoran appears through the glass window. Bancoran explains his presence stating that Patalliro acted a little unusual last night and thus come to investigate.

Bancoran and Marion meets and Bancoran questions the identity of Marion while introducing himself as Bancoran from MI6. As Marion has just stepped out of the bath, he is dressed in a bathrobe. Sensual music plays and Marion attempts to seduce Bancoran by undressing his bathrobe and standing in front of Bancoran naked. He pretends to fall for Bancoran at first sight and states his desire to be with Bancoran at least once prior to his capture by the MI6 agent. Bancoran appears to be convinced but Patalliro spots that Marion has a syringe and is about to stab Bancoran in the neck when Patalliro grabs the remaining syringe on the ground and tosses at Marion. Bancoran is thus made aware of Marion’s action and proceeds to slap Marion.

2 days later, Patalliro is all recovered and the Silver Fox group has been apprehended by Interpol. Patalliro laments that it was fun while having an elder brother. Episode ends with Patalliro trying to escaped being jabbed by his newly appointed Royal Physician.

Episode 5: Angle of Death, Maraich 
Patalliro visits the MI6 HQ on his way to the country of Rosaria, a country specialising in the cultivation of roses, as a special judge for a competition on roses by the invitation of a Count. Bancoran decides to accompany Patalliro to Rosaria after their usual exchange of insults. While on the plane, Patalliro cracks his usual jokes and Bancoran chides him for letting his guard down. He goes on to let Patalliro know that the International Diamond Syndicate (IDS) are making a move again and his life is in danger. Patalliro goes on the recount how the IDS tried to assassinate him 2 times. First being Thatcher and second being Bjorn (Junior).

Back at the IDS HQ, once again a veiled meeting is held. The boss asks how is the progress with No. 2 to which he replies that he has already dealt with Malynera’s cabinet members and the only remaining person is the king but, he too, has already set a trap for the king. The boss cautions on the interference of the MI6 but No.2 is confident about his success and mentions a plan to target the MI6. With this, the boss is pleased and No. 2’s  veil is revealed and he is Count Duran Du Larken.

After the meeting, Count Duran enters his limousine and speaks to a bishounen named Maraich. The Count goes on to say how he has taught Maraich assassination techniques from a young age. Maraich mentioned that he will not let the Count down and proceeds to seduce the Count and the Count comments that he has raised a bad boy. The Count and Maraich starts to make love at the back of the limousine.

Back at the Rozaria Hotel, Patalliro tells Bancoran that the same Count who invited him as a judge has also invited him to a costume party.  Next scene shows the start of the party, organised at the Count’s premises. Patalliro is in his usual royal attire while Bancoran is in a tuxedo with a mask.

The Count and Maraich observes Patalliro and Bancoran for a while and then make their way to be introduced. While Bancoran was having a smoke, the Count Larken introduces himself to Patalliro and manages to get Patalliro away from Bancoran by luring Patalliro away to the wine table. Bancoran’s intuition tells him that Count Lrken is suspicious and spots him speaking to masked man sneakily and the masked man heads out into the garden. Bancoran tails the mask man but only to be led to trap where Maraich is waiting. Maraich jumps from height with steel wires at hand to strangle Bancoran from behind.  Bancoran, who is always in gloves, manages to grip the wire at this throat. Bancoran realises that he has fallen into a trap and struggles with freeing himself from the wires. Using all his strength, he manages to create an opening and elbows Maraich sharply at this torso. This makes Maraich lose his grip and Bancoran is freed. They exchange blows and just as Maraich is about to escape into the garden bushes, Bancoran fires a shot at him. A small blood stain was left at the scene and upon hearing the gunshot, Count Larken trembles in anger at the sign that Maraich has failed in his mission to assassinate Bancoran. When the guests go out to investigate the loud sound, Bancoran exclaims that it came from a car backfiring behind the wall.

On the way back from the party, Bancoran tells Patalliro on the failed attempt on his life and how stealth the attacker was. He goes on to warn Patalliro about Count Larken’s possible involvement. Bancoran tells Patalliro that he will request for the MI6 to investigate the country of Rozaria itself. At this time, Patalliro brandishes a golden candlestick and tells Bancoran that he ‘accidently’ took the candlestick and since Count Larken is a bad guy there is no need to return the golden candlestick.

At night,  Maraich, with a gunshot injury on his left arm, visits the Count only to be treated cruelly for failing his mission. The Count reminds Maraich that to fail is to die in the organisation and he gives Maraich one last chance to atone for his mistake. Maraich directs all his grievance on Bancoran.

The next morning, the MI6 HQ updates Bancoran and while Patalliro is in disguise to try and conduct his own investigation, there he meets a cross-dressing Maraich with feather on his hat. At this point, Bancoran shows up and both Maraich and Bancoran sees each other without masks for the first time. Sensual music plays and both fall in love with each other at first sight. But Maraich is reminded that Bancoran is the man who made the Count treat him cruelly and hence hardened his heart to kill Bancoran. Bancoran asks Maraich for his name but Mariach walks pass Bancoran and says that is a bee. While Bancoran looks above to try and spot the bee, Maraich picks up the feather from his hat and attempts to stab the tip, which was dipped in poison, at Bancoran into his neck. Bancoran foils the attempt and remarks on Maraich’s clever plan to try and attribute the possible sting to a bee. Bancoran goes on to reveal that the moment their eyes met, Maraich’s cheeks turned red and hence Maraich should be a male as Bancoran is nicknamed the Bishouen-Killer so his charming effect should only have affected the male gender. At this point, Bancoran grads at Maraich’s arms forcefully and question on his relation with the Count. Maraich winches in pain from the gunshot wound and wound tears, with blood soaking through his clothes. Maraich collapses to the ground in pain and Bancoran realises that Maraich was the same assailant at the costume party. As a last ditch attempt, Maraich brings out a knife and takes a  jab at Bancoran only to be quickly disarmed and elbowed right in the stomach and hand-chopped at the neck. Maraich loses consciousness immediately. Bancoran marvels at how he has obtained a great source of information.

In the next scene, Maraich awakes in bed and asks Bancoran what are his intentions. Bancoran questions Maraich on Count Larken but Maraich is uncooperative. Bancoran slaps Maraich but Maraich remains uncooperative. Bancoran laments that he does not want to do these things but there are other ways to get information. He proceeds to rape Maraich.

The next morning , Bancoran tells Patalliro that Maraich has confessed and told him everything. Count Larken is IDS’s No. 2 but he has left the country of Rozaria. Patalliro questions the authenticity of the information to which Bancoran proclaims that there is no way that Maraich will lie to him. At this point, Maraich is seen to be led outside and Maraich asks Bancoran what will become of him to which Bancoran states that Maraich will be extradited to England and await his trial. Bancoran tells Maraich to expose the IDS as a malignant organisation as a whistle blower to possibly get prosecution immunity. Just as Maraich is about to be escorted away, Maraich asks Bancoran for a kiss. They kiss tenderly and Maraich says “Sayonara” (  a sign that they might not see each other again).

Episode 6: Etrange’s Grief 
At the Heathrow Airport, Bancoran arrives to greet Patalliro but there are spies planted by Count Larken tracking their movement. Apparently, Patalliro is on the way to Switzerland to visit his mother who is chronically ill. Bancoran imagines what Patalliro’s mother would look like only to be assaulted by hideous images. Bancoran question the timing of his visit and Patalliro explains that his mother, being chronically unwell, can only take visitations when she is feeling better. Bancoran tells Patalliro that the timing is bad as investigations has revealed that Count Larken is desperate to atone for his failure and is currently on the move to plot something against Patalliro. Patalliro mentions that it is for the same reason that he will wants Bancoran to be his bodyguard in his trip to Switzerland.

Back at the IDS HQ, at the veiled meeting, the boss asks No. 2 if they can get Malynera to re-join the IDS since his epic failure the first time. The boss also chides No.2 for losing Maraich, one whom No.2 has invested so dearly on, being captured by the MI6. No.2 declares that he will capture Patalliro’s mother as part of his plan this time. The boss allows No.2 to go ahead but reminds him that should he fail the second time, he will be gotten rid of. No.2 acknowledges that should he fail, he will die.

On their way to the sanatorium, Bancoran notices that Patalliro is nervous and Patalliro explains that it has been over a year he has seen his mother and that his mother is not a Malyneran but a noble lady from Northern Europe. During his younger days, the Kin Higgins the Third studies in Paris and fell in love at first sight with Patalliro’s mother. They were very close and the passing of Patalliro’s father dealt a great shock to her and she has only seemed to recover recently.

Just as Bancoran and Patalliro were bickering in the waiting room, Madam Etrange was ushered into the room and her beauty astounded Bancoran. Madam Etrange has heard of Bancoran from the numerous letters exchange between the mother and son pair and Etrange expresses her gratitude towards Bancoran for having saved her son numerous times. All 3 of them spend a leisurely afternoon admiring the scenery.

At this moment, the spies tailing Patalliro and gang have reached the sanatorium and tracked down the room that Patalliro will be staying in. They assume that Bancoran is with Patalliro guarding him.

Back in the reception room, Patalliro requests to be excused to bring tea for his mother and excuses himself. Once he leaves the room, Etrange smiles and comments that Patalliro likes to act all proper in front of her and it is just about time for him to gain some reprieve by sneaking out. Bancoran laughs at Etrange being aware of her son’s behaviour and they start to bond emotionally. Etrange tells Bancoran that Patalliro takes after his father and even though Etrange and her dead husband were 30 years apart, he was an honourable man.

That night, the spies continue to stack out at the sanatorium and Bancoran requests to leave for the hotel as it is getting late. Patalliro volunteers to accompany Bancoran to his car and Etrange bids him farewell with a melancholic look. Patalliro senses something between them and he asks Bancoran if he was interested in Etrange to which Bancoran replies that he finds Etrange a fine lady but he is not interested in women (aka Bancoran is gay).

Etrange returns to her room and the 2 spies kidnaps her. She lets out a scream and alerts Patalliro and Bancoran in the driveway. Both rush to the scene to find her missing with the window wide open.

Back at Count Larken’s castle, Etrange is pushed on the bed while she exclaims to the two assailants if they are aware that she is the Queen of Malynera. Count Larken appears and orders her to be quiet and tells her that she will not be harmed if she remains quiet. He soon realises that he has abducted Etrange. Etrange asks who he is and Count Larken expresses that he is not surprise at her failing to recognise him as his original name is Duran Continental. Larken is his mother’s family name. Etrange finally recognises that he is Cousin Duran and that his parents were worried about him. Duran replies that he is not keen to be like them, living as poor nobles but he is now an officer of the IDS. Etrange, on hearing that he is from IDS, exclaims that Duran tried to kill Patalliro, his own nephew. Duran tells Etrange not to be angry and reminds her she used to admire him and they held hands for walks in the garden. Duran tries to pull Etrange closer but Etrange slaps his hand away. Duran laments that the childhood friends they used to be and laughs menacingly.

Back at the sanatorium, a letter has arrived requesting for Malynera to return to the IDS in exchange for Etrange’s safety. Bancoran takes responsibility for Etrange’s abduction and rings Maraich back in London. Bancoran tells Maraich of what has happened and that the culprit is Larken. Bancoran wants Maraich to tell him where his hideout is but on hearing Larken’s name, Maraich turns melancholic. He takes out a diary with a photo of him and Larken taken when he was young. Bancoran tells Maraich that he understand that it will be painful for Maraich to betray Larken who was basically his adoptive father, but Maraich tells Bancoran that to take notes as there are four hideouts. After the phone call, Maraich is seen crouching in front of the fireplace and finally tossing the photo into the fire, whispering “Farewell, Count”.

Back in the sanatorium, Patalliro paces up and down and chides Bancoran for his nonchalance. Bancoran replies that the MI6 are now searching all 4 hideouts as revealed by Maraich and they should wait for more updates from MI6. With Patalliro dancing the Cock Robin to ease his nerves through the night, the sun finally rises and a phone call reaches them.

In the morning, the Count wonders if Patalliro hasn’t responded to re-join the IDS since the IDS did not give any updates. At this time, the assailants alerts the Count to cars arriving at the grounds and the Count realises that his whereabouts has been discovered. Duran proceeds to unlock the room n which he is hiding Etrange in and flees with her. Armed with machine guns, the MI6 stomp the grounds with Patalliro and Bancoran following behind. Heavy cross fire ensures and Etrange asks Duran what is happening and Duran mentions that they can hide in the nearby forest. However, on the way to the forest, they meet with Bancoran with pistol in hand and Patalliro. Bancoran asks for Duran to free Etrange which he does and Etrange files towards Bancoran, much to the anger and disappointment of Patalliro. Duran asks how his hideout was compromised and Bancoran tells him that Maraich was the snitch. On hearing that Maraich was the snitch, he tosses his gun away after kissing it and challenges Bancoran to a sword fight, telling Bancoran that even though he can no longer escape, he will not throw his pride as a noble away.

Bancoran agrees and they both take their stance. A fierce exchange ensues and both acknowledge the skills of their opponent. As the fighting intensifies, Bancoran disarms Duran with his sword point at Duran’s neck. Bancoran tells Duran that he has lost and just as Bancoran withdraws his word, Duran dishonourably pulls out a small pistol from his blazer pocket aiming at Bancoran. Bancoran claims that he is cheating but Duran tells Bancoran that he will be erased by the IDS anyway as he has failed twice. As Bancoran backs aways and Duran is prepared to shoot, Patalliro swifty dives for the gun tossed to the ground, Bancoran readies his sword to throw at Duran and a shot is heard. The shot by Duran misses Bancoran by a mile as Duran seems to have been injured. He falls to the ground but Bancoran is still holding his sword. When Duran finally collapses, behind him is revealed that it was Etrange who has shot at Duran with a crossbow and arrow taken from the castle exhibit. Etrange is shaken by the ordeal and collapses to the ground.

Several days later, Patalliro asks Etrange if she would return to Malynera but she declines and says that it is not the time. She reminisces her childhood days with Duran and mourns for her pitiable cousin whom she had so much affection for. Bancoran leaves with Patalliro without bidding farewell to Etrange.

Legacy
Rock musician Tomoaki Ishizuka took his stage name "Pata" from Patalliro, his nickname in high school as he was said to resemble the series' title character.

Yu Yu Hakusho author Yoshihiro Togashi based his character Hiei's design on Patalliro!skunky.

References

External links 
 Official Patalliro! website 
 Patalliro! at Toei Animation 
 

1979 manga
1982 anime television series debuts
1983 anime films
2003 manga
2004 manga
2005 anime television series debuts
Comedy anime and manga
Fuji TV original programming
Hakusensha franchises
Hakusensha manga
Magic Bus (studio)
Shōjo manga
Shōnen-ai anime and manga
Toei Animation television
Toei Animation films